Luis César Alvarado Martínez (January 15, 1949 – March 20, 2001), born in Lajas, Puerto Rico was an infielder in Major League Baseball (MLB). From 1968 through 1977, he played for the Boston Red Sox, Chicago White Sox, St. Louis Cardinals, Cleveland Indians, New York Mets and Detroit Tigers. Alvarado batted and threw right-handed.

Biography

Nicknamed "Pimba", Alvarado broke into the majors in 1968 with the Boston Red Sox. In 1969 he started at Triple-A with the Louisville Colonels, and led the International League in runs (89) and hits (166), garnering Most Valuable Player honors. He returned to the Red Sox at the end of the season.

Alvarado divided much of his career playing time between shortstop and second base. After hitting .224 in 59 games for Boston in 1970, he was traded along with Mike Andrews to the Chicago White Sox for Luis Aparicio on December 1 of that year. His most productive season came in 1972, when he posted career-highs in runs (30), hits (57), doubles (14) and games (103). He played in parts of 1974 to 1977 divided between the Cardinals, Indians, Mets and Tigers and for several teams in the Mexican League from 1979 to 1981. In nine seasons, he posted a .214 batting average with five home runs and 84 runs batted in (RBIs) in 463 games played.

Alvarado died in his hometown of Lajas, Puerto Rico, at the age of 52 from a heart attack on March 20, 2001.

See also
 List of Major League Baseball players from Puerto Rico

References

External links

1949 births
2001 deaths
Boston Red Sox players
Cachorros de León players
Chicago White Sox players
Cleveland Indians players
Detroit Tigers players
Diablos Rojos del México players
Hawaii Islanders players
International League MVP award winners
Leones de Yucatán players
Louisville Colonels (minor league) players
Major League Baseball infielders
Major League Baseball players from Puerto Rico
New York Mets players
Oklahoma City 89ers players
People from Lajas, Puerto Rico
Pittsfield Red Sox players
St. Louis Cardinals players
Sultanes de Monterrey players
Tulsa Oilers (baseball) players
Waterloo Hawks (baseball) players